The term thrashing may refer to:
 Thrashing (computer science), an effect of computer memory contention
 A severe corporal punishment
 A clear victory
 The dance style moshing
 Threshing, a process in agriculture
 Skateboard Thrashin'
Vandalism